An attached gas-check was a copper plate that was physically attached to the base of a studded projectile of rifled muzzle-loading ("RML") artillery, sealing the escape of gas between the projectile and the barrel.

Gallery

 RML 12.5in Studded Palliser Shell Mk III with Attached Gas-Check Mk II
 RML 12.5in Studded Common Shell Mk I with Attached Gas-Check Mk II
 RML 12.5in Studded Shrapnel Shell Mk I with Attached Gas-check Mk II

See also
 Gas-checks in British RML heavy guns
 Automatic gas-check

References
 Chapter XII

Artillery ammunition
Coastal artillery
Artillery of the United Kingdom
Victorian-era weapons of the United Kingdom
Naval guns of the United Kingdom